Dowlat Qarin-e Olya (also Romanized as Dowlat Qarīn-e ‘Olyā; also known as Dowlat Qarīn-e Bālā) is a village in Vardasht Rural District, in the Central District of Semirom County, Isfahan Province, Iran. At the 2006 census, its population was 70, in 18 families.

References 

Populated places in Semirom County